Frank and Fearless is a 2018 comedy adventure film by Leon Schuster and Gray Hofmeyr. The film featured local actors, and used music performed by the Drakondale Girls' Choir, Till You're Free Again, won 1st prize in the Great American Song Contest (2018) in the Special Category. The film centers on poaching of rhinos.

Plot 
Fearless (Themba Ntuli), a young boy who lives in the African bush, befriends an orphaned baby rhino called Reini. Reini was orphaned by poachers and Fearless determines to put an end to the slaughter of rhino and prevent any more young rhino growing up without its parents. He plans to achieve this by kidnapping the ambassador of a South-East Asian country, using the Kruger Rand coin that his father left him to fund the travel and recruit the help he needs for his mission. Fearless and Reini team up with Dog, a Rottweiler, and Sonny Frank,(Leon Schuster) a roguish character who lives on his wits. The film follows the unlikely gang as they tackle Fearless' mission - through dangerous, comical and heart-wrenching moments.

The group face obstacles and opposition on their journey. Dolf, a corrupt ranger turned poacher, and his gang of ruthless criminals hinder their progress. Dolf and Sonny Frank's chequered history and mutual contempt causes some tight and often funny situations. Adventures, captures and some awkward characters line the path the friends take to reach their goal. Fearless and his crew have unlikely helpers from the bush itself, including wild animals and magic mushrooms.

Production 
The African bush scenes were shot in Broederstroom, Hekpoort and beyond, much of it on Glen Afric with assistance from the Rhino Pride Foundation. The Department of Environmental Affairs, together with SAN Parks, came on board as the primary sponsor.

Director/film maker, Gray Hofmeyr, in an interview with AnimalTalk said, "We have all the comedy implicit in a road movie about four diverse and wacky individuals, whom we grow to love, on an impossible quest, trying and failing to overcome their differences and the obstacles and evils they encounter. Which is funny. And also very emotional, not just for the characters themselves, but also for the audience watching. And it is all set in a powerful story with a powerful message. Laughter and tears can follow one from the other very quickly and with very high emotion."

Reception 
The film received mixed reviews. Ethan van Diemen summarised these in his review for News24.

Controversy 
There is controversary around the film - it is one of a number of Leon Scuster's films that Showmax took off the circuit in 2020 to evaluate for racial sensitivity.  Following a review, Frank and Fearless is being reinstated.

Music 
Nic Paton composed the soundtrack, and the main theme was by Don Clarke.

The Don Clarke song, Till You're Free Again is used throughout the movie, and in the empassioned plea in the finale. The song has also been used by Rhino Revolution, a conservation project, to save the rhinos.

References

External links 

South African drama films
2018 films
English-language South African films
2010s English-language films